Timothy L. Bowens (born February 7, 1973) is an athlete and former American football defensive tackle who played 11 seasons for the Miami Dolphins of the National Football League (NFL). He played college football for the University of Mississippi, and was chosen with the 20th pick of the 1994 NFL Draft by the Miami Dolphins.

The Dolphins were initially criticized for picking Bowens, as he was overweight and had played only nine games in his college career at Mississippi. He had a terrific rookie season in 1994, and Bowens was named 'The NFL Defensive Rookie of the Year' by the Associated Press. He played with the Miami Dolphins for 11 years before he retired after the 2004 NFL season.

High school career
Tim Bowens was born and grew up in Okolona, Mississippi, one of two county seats in rural Chickasaw County. He played football at Okolona High School. He was an All-State pick as a senior and an All-District pick as a junior and senior. As a senior, he led his team to the Class AA semifinals and an 11-2 record. He was also a two-year letter winner in basketball.

References

1973 births
Living people
People from Okolona, Mississippi
American football defensive tackles
Itawamba Indians football players
Miami Dolphins players
Ole Miss Rebels football players
National Football League Defensive Rookie of the Year Award winners
American Conference Pro Bowl players